Neonatal Hemochromatosis is a rare and severe liver disease of unknown origin, though research suggests that it may be alloimmune condition.  Its characteristics are similar to hereditary hemochromatosis, where iron deposition causes damage to the liver and other organs and tissues.

Causes
The causes of neonatal hemochromatosis are still unknown, but recent research has led to the hypothesis that it is an alloimmune disease.  Evidence supporting this hypothesis includes the high rate among siblings (>80%).  This evidence along with other research indicates that neonatal hemochromatosis could be classified as a congenital alloimmune hepatitis.

Diagnosis

Differential diagnosis
The condition is sometimes confused with juvenile hemochromatosis, which is a hereditary hemochromatosis caused by mutations of a gene called hemojuvelin.  While the symptoms and outcomes for these two diseases are similar, the causes appear to be different.

Treatment
Effective treatment of the disease has been confined to liver transplants.  Success has also been reported with an antioxidant chelation cocktail, though its effectiveness cannot be confirmed. Based on the alloimmune cause hypothesis, a new treatment involving high-dose immunoglobulin to pregnant mothers who have had a previous pregnancy with a confirmed neonatal hemochromatosis outcome, has provided very encouraging results.

References

Further reading
  link

External links 
 Hemachromatosis page at the National Center for Biotechnology Information

Iron metabolism
Genetic disorders with OMIM but no gene
Hepatology
Rare diseases